The Eliot-Pearson Award for Excellence in Children’s Media is an award given biennially to honor outstanding contributions in the field of children’s media.  The award is given by the Eliot-Pearson Department of Child Study and Human Development and the Film and Media Studies Program at Tufts University at Tufts University.  The award is given to organizations, individuals, or companies that have made important inroads in the world of children’s media.

The Award is known as an “Abby,” named after Abigail Adams Eliot, a woman who, along with Elizabeth Pearson, is credited with helping to establish the early childhood movement of the first part of the 20th century, when they established the Ruggles Street Nursery School in Boston to serve children living in poverty in 1922. This school became affiliated with Tufts University and, in 1964, became the Eliot-Pearson Department of Child Study.

Award Selection Criteria 
 The media product must in some way demonstrate an understanding that children are developmentally at different stages
 The media product must demonstrate ethnic/racial diversity
 The media product must demonstrate positive, non-stereotypical images of gender
 The media product will in some way(s) model positive social interactions among children
 The media product will demonstrate peaceful resolutions to conflicts
 The media product will show a variety of models of friendships and family images
 The media product is educational and/or informational
 The media product will appeal to a cross-section of children
 The media product will contain enough “depth” so that parents will watch/listen/participate along with their children
 The media product is widely available to children
 The media product will be of a high production quality
 The media product will be entertaining/humorous on different levels so as to appeal to children of different age groups and parents, as well

Eliot-Pearson Awards 2014 
 Sesame Street, a long-running American children's television series created by Joan Ganz Cooney and Lloyd Morrisett

Eliot-Pearson Awards 2012 
 Levar Burton, actor, director, producer, author and former host of Reading Rainbow

Eliot-Pearson Awards 2011
 Alvin Poussaint, author and child psychiatrist

Eliot-Pearson Awards 2008
 Peggy Charren, Founder, Action for Children’s Television
 Micheal Flaherty, President, Walden Media
 Dorothea Gillim, Executive Producer, WordGirl
 Mitchel Resnick, Creator, “Scratch” software

Eliot-Pearson Awards 2006
 Carol Greenwald, Executive Producer, Arthur
 Judy Stoia, Executive Producer, Between the Lions
 Kate Taylor, Executive Producer, Zoom

Eliot-Pearson Awards 2004
 Chris Gifford, Creator and Executive Producer, Dora the Explorer
 Valerie Walsh Valdes, Creator and Executive Producer, Dora the Explorer
 Cathy Galeota, Producer, Dora the Explorer
 Deborah Forte, Executive Producer, Maya and Miguel
 Linda Ellerbee, Executive Producer, Nick News
 Mark Lyons, Producer, Nick News

Eliot-Pearson Awards 2001
 Craig Bartlett, Executive Producer of Hey Arnold!

References 

Children's media and toys awards